A Doctor of Science (most commonly abbreviated DSc or ScD) is an academic research doctorate awarded in a number of countries throughout the world. In some countries, a Doctor of Science is the degree used for the standard doctorate in the sciences; elsewhere a Doctor of Science is a "higher doctorate" awarded in recognition of a substantial and sustained contribution to scientific knowledge beyond that required for a Doctor of Philosophy (PhD).

Africa

Algeria and Morocco 
In Algeria, Morocco, Libya and Tunisia, all universities accredited by the state award a "Doctorate" in all fields of science and humanities, equivalent to a PhD in the United Kingdom or United States.

Some universities in these four Arab countries award a "Doctorate of the State" in some fields of study and science. A "Doctorate of the State" is slightly higher in esteem than a regular doctorate, and is awarded after performing additional in-depth post-doctorate research or achievement.

Asia

Japan 

Similar to the situation in the US, Japanese universities offer both the PhD and the ScD as initial doctorates in science.

India 
In India only a few prestigious universities offer ScD/DScin science which is obtained in Graduate School after satisfactory evaluation of knowledge, research accomplishment, and a doctoral defence. The oldest institute to award a DSc degree in India is Rajabazar Science College, University of Calcutta.

Thailand 
Higher education institutes in Thailand generally grant PhD for research doctoral degree, except some universities such as Chulalongkorn University award DSc. In exception, Mahidol University can grant both PhD and DSc Doctoral students in Faculty of Science are always awarded PhD, but some other programs award DSc.

Uzbekistan 
The higher education institutes in Uzbekistan also grant DSc degrees. As an example, the National University of Uzbekistan and the Uzbekistan Academy of Sciences offer DSc in various fields.

Europe

Austria, Germany, and Switzerland 
In Germany, Austria, and the German-speaking part of Switzerland, the most common doctoral degrees in Natural Sciences are the following:
 Dr. rer. nat.: Doctor rerum naturalium, literally "Doctor of the things of nature"
 Dr rer. medic.: Doctor rerum medicarum, Doctor of medical sciences
 Dr sc. nat.: Doktor der Naturwissenschaften, Doctor of Natural Sciences
 Dr sc. ETH: Doktor der Naturwissenschaften ETH, Doctor of Natural Sciences, awarded by ETH Zurich, Switzerland.
 Dr phil. nat.: Doctor philosophiae naturalis, used only by Goethe University Frankfurt instead of Dr rer. nat; Doctor of Natural Sciences, awarded by Swiss universities.
 Dr.-Ing.: Doktor der Ingenieurwissenschaften (Doctor of Engineering), awarded by German universities in areas of technology and engineering.
 Dr mont.: Doctor rerum montanarum, awarded by the University of Leoben instead of Dr techn.
 Dr techn.: Doctor technicae, awarded by Austrian technical universities.
 Dr nat. techn.: Doctor rerum naturalium technicarum, awarded by the University of Natural Resources and Life Sciences, Vienna instead of Dr techn.

In these countries there are some related doctoral degrees with very similar names, these are the:

 Dr sc. agr.: Doctor scientiarum agrariarum, Doctor of Agricultural science
 Dr sc. hum.: Doctor scientiarum humanarum, Doctor of Humanistic Sciences
 Dr sc. inf.: Doctor scientiarum informaticarum, Doctor of Science in Informatics
 Dr sc. inf.med.: Doctor scientiarum informaticarum medicæ, Doctor of Science in Medical Informatics
 Dr sc. inf.biomed.: Doctor scientiarum informaticarum biomedicæ, Doctor of Science in Biomedical Informatics
 Dr sc. math.: Doctor scientiarum mathematicarum, Doctor of Mathematics
 Dr scient. med.: Doctor scientiæ medicæ, Doctor of Medical Sciences
 Dr sc. mus.: Doctor scientiae musicae, Doctor of Musicology
 Dr sc. oec.: Doctor scientiarum oeconomicarum, Doctor of Economics
 Dr sc. pol.: Doctor scientiarum politicarum, Doctor of Political Sciences
 Dr rer. pol.: Doctor rerum politicarum, Doctor of economics, business administration, or political science
 Dr sc. soc.: Doctor scientiae socialis, Doctor of Social Sciences

All these doctoral degrees are equivalent to the PhD or ScD of the American system. Until German Reunification, universities in East Germany also awarded the DrSc. However, the East German DrSc was not equivalent to the PhD since it was adopted to replace the German Habilitation and therefore was equivalent to this higher-level qualification. After reunification the Habilitation was reintroduced at universities in Eastern Germany.

The procedure of habilitation is normally required to receive officially the "venia docendi", which entitles the candidate to lecture at universities (Privatdozent, for men, or Privatdozentin, for women). The academic degree after the successful habilitation is e.g. Dr. rer.nat. habil., by adding the suffix "habil." to the earlier received Doctors degree.

In Switzerland, the Dr sc. is a doctoral degree awarded only by the two Swiss Federal Institutes of Technology (EPFL and ETHZ), the University of Fribourg and the Department of Informatics of the University of Zurich. The Swiss Dr sc., like the DSc in the US, is equivalent to the PhD. It is earned with the approval of a committee on the basis of original research, publications, and extensive applied professional contributions and is awarded in doctoral level science and technology programs. Since 2004 the Dr sc. is the only doctoral degree awarded by the ETH Zurich. The École polytechnique fédérale de Lausanne awards the degree Docteur ès sciences, abbreviated Dr ès sc.and translated into English as PhD.

Poland 
It is very similar to the equivalent habilitation degree in Germany and Austria. It is also very similar (in terms of requirements) to associate professor with tenure.

The highest scientific degree in Poland is "professorship" or "full professor", which is called a scientific title of professor. "Habilitation" has been a mandatory requirement for many years to apply for full professorship in Poland.

United Kingdom, Ireland, India, Pakistan and the Commonwealth 

In Ireland, the United Kingdom and the countries of the Commonwealth, such as India (in the Indian Institute of Technology, Bombay), the degree of Doctor of Science (DSc or ScD) is one of the Higher Doctorates. In some older universities it typically has precedence after Divinity, Laws or Civil Law, Medicine, and Letters, and above Music. The degree is conferred on a member of the university who has a proven record of internationally recognised scholarship. A candidate for the degree will usually be required to submit a selection of their publications to the board of the appropriate faculty, which will decide if the candidate merits this accolade. The award or obtaining of a regular PhD degree is not in any way a pre-requisite for obtaining a DSc, as, for example, it can happen in the sciences that an academic who does a lot of publishing can be awarded a DSc without ever having done a PhD degree.

The first University to admit an individual to this degree was the University of London in 1860. In 1893 Maria Gordon (née Ogilvie), was the first woman to receive this degree.

In former times the doctorate in science was regarded as a greater distinction than a professorial chair and hence a professor who was also a DSc would be known as Doctor. The Doctor of Science may also be awarded as an honorary degree, that is, given to individuals who have made extensive contributions to a particular field and not for specific academic accomplishments. It is usual to signify this by adding DSc h.c. (for honoris causa).

Other European Union countries 
In the Czech Republic and Slovakia "Doctor of Sciences" (DrSc behind the name), established in 1953, is equivalent to the degree of Doctor of Science in the sense in which the DSc is used in the Commonwealth. It is the highest academic qualification, different from both PhD and PhDr. titles. In the Czech Republic, DrSc has not been awarded since 2001; instead, since 2006, a "Doctor of Sciences" degree (DSc behind the name) has been awarded, not by universities but by the Czech Academy of Sciences mostly for research in the field of natural or formal science. In Slovakia, "Doctor of Sciences" (DrSc) is awarded by the Slovak Academy of Sciences.

In Hungary, "Doctor of Sciences" (DSc) is awarded by the Hungarian Academy of Sciences.

In Finland, most doctoral degrees awarded in the fields of natural sciences, technology and economics are termed DSc degrees in English, with a suffix indicating the field of study. However, there is no translation of the term Doctor of Science to Finnish. For example, the proper translation for the doctorate in technology (tekniikan tohtori) would be DSc (Tech), whereas a doctorate in economics and business administration (kauppatieteiden tohtori) would be translated as DSc (Econ). When conversing or writing in English, the prefix Dr may be used to address a holder of a doctoral degree awarded in Finland. The degrees are equivalent to filosofian tohtori (FT, English: PhD), but FT is usually awarded only in general sciences, not in specializations like engineering, economics or medicine.

In France, the Doctor of Sciences degree (doctorat ès sciences also called doctorat d'État) was a higher doctorate in the fields of experimental and natural sciences, superseded in 1984 by the habilitation.

In Denmark, Dr Scient. is a higher doctorate.

In Bulgaria, PhD is the highest education level and first science degree. Doctor of Science is the second and the highest science degree.

Other European countries 
In the former Yugoslavia, (Croatia, Serbia, Bosnia and Herzegovina, Montenegro, Slovenia, North Macedonia), title doktor nauka or doktor znanosti (literally "doctor of science") is used in a much broader sense than DSc, simply referring to a field of academic study – from art history (doktor znanosti/nauka povijesti umjetnosti), philosophy (doktor znanosti/nauka filozofije), and literary studies (doktor znanosti/nauka književnosti) to hard sciences such as molecular biology (doktor znanosti/nauka molekularne biologije). It is therefore formally recognized as a PhD degree.

Starting in 2016, in Ukraine Doctor of Philosophy (PhD) is the highest education level and first science degree. "Doctor of Sciences" (DSc ) is the second and the highest science degree, awarded in recognition of a substantial contribution to scientific knowledge, origination of new directions and visions in science. A PhD degree is a prerequisite for heading a university department in Ukraine.

In Belarus "Doctor of Sciences" (DSc) is the highest level of education that follows a PhD. Is awarded by The Higher Attestation Commission under the aegis of the President of the Republic of Belarus.

North America

United States 
In the United States, the formally recognized traditional Doctor of Science is an academic research doctoral degree awarded by research universities. The academic research ScD (or DSc) is considered by both the United States Department of Education and the National Science Foundation to be equivalent to the more commonly awarded PhD and not higher than a PhD as is the case in some European countries.

The first North American ScD was inaugurated by Harvard University in 1872, when graduate studies first began at Harvard, and where the PhD and ScD degrees were introduced in the same year. The Doctor of Science research degree is earned with the formal dissertation defense and approval of a committee on the basis of original research and publications, and it is awarded predominantly in doctoral-level science programs, such as engineering, medical and health sciences, and health economics.

Although rarer than the Doctor of Philosophy, the Doctor of Science is awarded by institutions including the following:

 Harvard University
 Columbia University
 Middle Georgia State University 
 Johns Hopkins University 
 Massachusetts Institute of Technology, 
 Capitol Technology University
 Bowie State University 
 Towson University 
 Tulane University 
 University of Baltimore 
 Marymount University
 Rocky Mountain University of Health Professions
 Westbrook University  
 Aspen University in Computer Science 
 Jacksonville State University in emergency management  
 Spertus Institute for Jewish Learning and Leadership in Jewish studies.
 The George Washington University (although as of 2011 the university decided to offer only the more widely recognized PhD degree)

A few university doctoral research programs offer both the ScD and PhD degrees in the same academic field, such as Johns Hopkins University and Massachusetts Institute of Technology, with identical requirements for obtaining either. Currently, research programs that offer the formal research ScD but not the PhD degree for a given field include several doctoral programs at Harvard University, Boston University, Capitol Technology University, Texas Tech University Health Sciences Center and Dakota State University. The University of Baltimore, School of Information Arts and Technologies offers an ScD degree in Information and Interaction Design, a program focused on usable design/user experience (UX) and Human Computer Interaction (HCI).

There are programs where the ScD and PhD have different degree requirements, though the two degrees are officially considered equivalent. The Engineering school at Washington University in St. Louis, for example, requires four more graduate courses, which can be completed in one year in conjunction with research duties, in the DSc program than the PhD degree, while the PhD requires teaching assistance services. The Johns Hopkins University also offers both PhD and ScD in certain programs, with only minor differences in university administration of the degrees. In some institutions, the ScD has been converted to the PhD. For instance, the doctoral degree in biostatistics at Harvard recently converted from ScD to PhD, even though the doctoral degree structure and requirements have remained identical.

Mexico 

In Mexico the PhD level is considered a doctoral degree (level 8) similar to the doctorate degrees in Canada and the United States. The Doctor of Sciences degree is instead recognized as a Higher Degree (Grado Proprio).

Russia and other post-communist states 

In Russia as well as in some other former Communist Bloc countries, the status of Russian Doktor nauk (literally 'Doctor of Sciences') is considered a post-doctoral degree. The degree has no American equivalent but rather is similar to German Habilitation.

South America

Argentina 

In Argentina the formal title Doctor of Science would be attributed to different fields of the hard or soft sciences. To get into an Argentine PhD program the applicant must have experience in research and at least an Engineering, Licentiate or master's degree:

Applied sciences 
 Doctorate of Agronomic Sciences (University of Buenos Aires, NU of LP, NU of C, NU of R, NU of MP, NU of the S)
 Doctorate of Sciences in Lacteal Technology (NU of the L)
 Doctorate of Sciences in Material Technology (NU of the S, NU of MP)
 Doctorate of Computer Sciences (University of Buenos Aires, NU of C, NU of SL, NU of the S)
 Doctorate of Engineering Sciences (NU of C, NU of Cu, NU of RC, NU of the S, ITBA)
 Doctorate of Geological Sciences (NU of C, NU of Cu, NU of SJ, NU of SL, NU of the S)
 Doctorate of Informatics Sciences (NU of LP)
 Doctorate of Basic Sciences Applied (NU of Q)
 Doctorate of Science and Technology (NU of GS)
 Doctorate of Geological Sciences (University of Buenos Aires)
 Doctorate of Molecular Biology and Biotechnology (NU of SAM)
 Doctorate of Systems Control (NU of the S)
 Doctorate of Economics Sciences (NU of LM)
 Doctorate of Economy (NU of LP, NU of the S)
 Doctorate of Geography (NU of the S)
 Doctorate of History (NU of the S)
 Doctorate of Chemical Engineering (NU of the S)

Basic sciences 
 Doctorate of Biological Sciences (U of BA, NU of LP, NU of C, NU of R, NU of the L, NU of Cu, NU of RC, NU of MP, NU of the S)
 Doctorate of Biological Chemistry Sciences (U of BA, NU of the S)
 Doctorate of Molecular Biology Sciences (U of BA)
 Doctorate of Mathematics Sciences (U of BA, NU of LP, NU of SL, NU of the S)
 Doctorate of Chemistry Sciences (NU of LP, NU of R, NU of C, NU of RC, NU of MP, NU of the S)
 Doctorate of Physics Sciences (U of BA, NU of LP, NU of MP, NU of SAM, NU of the S)
 Doctorate of Natural Sciences (U of BA, NU of LP)
 Doctorate of Philosophy (NU of the S)

Brazil 
In Brazil only the Doctor in Sciences (DSc) category is recognized as a higher doctorate, generally followed by the concentration area (program field).

This kind of doctorate is obtained in Graduate School after satisfactory evaluation of knowledge, research accomplishment, and thesis defense. This doctorate is comparable to a PhD program found in other countries. In the state of São Paulo, the doctorate title is the second highest academic title given by the state's universities (University of São Paulo (USP), State University of Campinas (UNICAMP) and São Paulo State University (UNESP)) and most Federal Universities, such as the Federal University of São Paulo (UNIFESP). The highest academic title is the Livre-Docência, which is not equivalent to the German Habilitation, since "Livre-Docência" is not a requisite to be a professor in Brazilian universities, and German Habilitation is a requisite to be a professor in German universities.

References 

Science, Doctor of
Higher doctorates